Live 1984 may refer to:
Grand Slam: Live 1984 a live album by Irish rock band Grand Slam released in 2003 but recorded in 1984
David Gilmour Live 1984 film by David Gilmour from his 1984 tour from the album About Face for Europe
Live 1984 by Gregory Isaac